The family Polychelidae contains thirty-eight extant species of blind, benthic lobster-like crustaceans. They are found throughout the world's tropical, sub-tropical and temperate oceans, including the Mediterranean Sea and the Irish Sea.

Anatomy
The family Polychelidae is notable for the number of chelate (clawed) limbs, with either four or all five pairs of pereiopods bearing claws. This gives rise to the scientific names Polycheles (many-clawed) and Pentacheles (five claws). The first pair of periopods are greatly elongated, but often become broken off while specimens are being brought to the surface. The rostrum is very short or absent, and, although eyestalks are present, the eyes are absent. This family can be seen as evidence of the transition from shrimp-like animals to lobster-like animals, since they possess a number of primitive characters (plesiomorphies), such as the pointed telson, in contrast to the rounded telson in lobsters.

Discovery
Although apparently widespread, and at least locally common, they were first discovered only in the late nineteenth century when they were dredged up by the Challenger expedition from a depth supposed to be "barren, if not of all life, certainly of animals so high in the scale of existence" (Charles Spence Bate). Their kinship with the fossil group Eryonoidea, including well-known genera such as Eryon, was immediately recognised. Since Eryon and its relatives were only known from fossils, lastly in the Jurassic, this made the Polychelidae something of a living fossil.

This also accounts for the lack of eyesight, since almost none of the sun's light penetrates to such abyssal depths.

Fossil record
A single fossil species is known, Antarcticheles antarcticus, which was found in Jurassic sediments on James Ross Island, close to the Prince Gustav Channel.

Larvae
The larvae of polychelids are very distinctive, and were first described under the name Eryoneicus. Over forty different larval forms are known, although few can be ascribed to known adult species.

Classification

Polycheles Heller, 1862
Polycheles aculeatus Galil, 2000
Polycheles auriculatus (Bate, 1878)
Polycheles baccatus Bate, 1878
Polycheles ceratus Alcock, 1878
Polycheles coccifer Galil, 2000
Polycheles enthrix (Bate, 1878)
Polycheles evexus Galil, 2000
Polycheles galil Ahyong & Brown, 2002
Polycheles helleri Bate, 1878
Polycheles kermadecensis Ahyong and Brown, 2002
Polycheles nanus (S. I. Smith, 1884)
Polycheles pacificus (Faxon, 1893)
Polycheles perarmatus Holthuis, 1952
Polycheles phosphorus (Alcock, 1894)
Polycheles politus Galil, 2000
Polycheles sculptus S. I. Smith, 1880
Polycheles suhmi (Bate, 1878)
Polycheles surdus Galil, 2000
Polycheles talismani (Bouvier, 1917)
Polycheles tanneri Faxon, 1893
Polycheles trispinosus (De Man, 1905)
Polycheles typhlops Heller, 1862
†Antarcticheles Aguirre-Urreta, Buatois, Chernoglasov & Medina, 1990
†Antarcticheles antarcticus Aguirre-Urreta, Buatois, Chernoglasov & Medina, 1990
Cardus Galil, 2000
Cardus crucifer (Thomson, 1873)
Homeryon Galil, 2000
Homeryon armarium Galil, 2000
Homeryon asper (Rathbun, 1906)
Pentacheles Bate, 1878
Pentacheles gibbus Alcock, 1894
Pentacheles laevis Bate, 1878
Pentacheles obscurus Bate, 1878
Pentacheles snyderii (Rathbun, 1906)
Pentacheles validus A. Milne-Edwards, 1880
Willemoesia Grote, 1873
Willemoesia forceps A. Milne Edwards, 1880
Willemoesia inornata Faxon, 1893
Willemoesia leptodactyla (Willemoes-Suhm, 1875)
Willemoesia pacifica Sund, 1920
Angusteryon Audo & Furrer, 2020
Augusteryon oberlii

References

Polychelida
Taxa named by James Wood-Mason
Decapod families